In the run-up to the general election on 8 June 2017, various organisations carried out opinion polling to gauge voting intentions. Results of such polls are displayed in this article. Most of the polling companies listed are members of the British Polling Council (BPC) and abide by its disclosure rules.

The date range for these opinion polls is from after the previous general election, held on 7 May 2015, to immediately before 8 June 2017. Under fixed-term legislation, the next general election was scheduled to be held on 7 May 2020. However, on 18 April 2017, Prime Minister Theresa May said that she would seek to bring forward the general election to Thursday 8 June 2017, which the House of Commons approved on 19 April. For an early election to be held, two-thirds of the total membership of the House had to support the resolution. The Conservative Party went into the election defending its overall majority won in 2015 with the Labour Party as the leading opposition party both in terms of polling numbers and seats.

Most opinion polls cover only Great Britain, as Northern Ireland seats are contested by a different set of political parties. Most YouGov polls include the Scottish National Party and Plaid Cymru as single options. The English and Welsh, Scottish, and Northern Irish Green Parties are also treated as a single option by most polls.

Graphical summaries

Poll results 
Poll results are listed in the table below in reverse chronological order. The highest percentage figure in each polling survey is displayed in bold, and the background shaded in the leading party's colour. The "Lead" column shows the percentage-point difference between the two parties with the highest figures. If there is a tie, no figure is shaded but both are displayed in bold. Poll results are generally rounded to the nearest percentage point (where a result is less than 0.5%, but more than zero, it is indicated by '*'). Percentages may not add to 100%, due to rounding. Data for all polls listed was obtained online, with the exception of Ipsos MORI and Survation, who obtained their data both online and by telephone.

The poll results shown are the 'headline' figures, those published or broadcast in the mainstream media. Polling organisations obtain raw data from respondents and subsequently adjust or 'weight' this according to their projections of turnout and voting on election day based on, for example, age and party preference.  Each polling organisation weights its raw data differently.

The six parties with the largest numbers of votes in the 2015 general election are listed here. Other parties are included in the "Others" column.

2017

2016

2015

YouGov model 
During the election campaign, YouGov created a Multilevel Regression and Post-stratification (MRP) model based on poll data. As set out by YouGov, the model "works by modelling every constituency and key voter types in Britain based on analysis of key demographics as well as past voting behaviour", with new interviews to registered voters conducted every day.

UK-wide seat projections 
The UK's first-past-the-post electoral system means that national shares of the vote do not give an exact indicator of how the various parties will be represented in Parliament. Different commentators and pollsters provided a number of predictions, based on polls and other data, as to how the parties would be represented in Parliament:

Lord Ashcroft Polls announced an estimate for the election result. He updated it at intervals on his website.

Electoral Calculus maintained a running projection of seats according to latest polls on its website based on universal changes from the previous general election results according to opinion poll averages. It also maintained a seat-by-seat projection for Scotland.

Election Forecast also maintained a projection of seats based on current opinion poll averages on their website.

Elections Etc. issued regular forecasts based on current opinion poll averages, betting markets, expert predictions and other sources on their website.

YouGov issued daily seat estimates using their aggregated statistical election model.

Britain Elects maintained a 'nowcast' of seats based on historical data as well as national and regional polling.

ScenariPolitici.com maintained a projection of seats based on current opinion poll averages on their website.

Spreadex maintained Party Seats spread bets throughout the election, with prices updated daily.

Sub-national polling

Scotland

Wales

Northern Ireland

Regional polling in England

North East England

North West England

Yorkshire and the Humber

East Midlands

West Midlands

East of England

London

South East

South West

Polls of individual constituencies

Battersea

Brighton Pavilion 

†The Liberal Democrats did not field a candidate in Brighton Pavilion.

Edinburgh South 

†There was neither a Scottish Green nor any "other" candidates fielded Edinburgh South.

Kensington

Tatton 

†UKIP did not field a candidate in Tatton.

Preferred Prime Minister polling 
Some opinion pollsters have asked voters which party leader they would prefer as Prime Minister – Theresa May (Conservative Party) or Jeremy Corbyn (Labour Party). The questions differ slightly from pollster to pollster:

 Opinium, Lord Ashcroft and YouGov:  "Which of the following do you think would make the best Prime Minister?"
 Kantar Public: "If you had to choose between Theresa May and Jeremy Corbyn, who do you think would make the best leader for Britain?"
 Ipsos MORI: "Who do you think would make the most capable Prime Minister, the Conservative’s  Theresa May, or Labour’s Jeremy Corbyn?"
 Survation: "Which of the following party leaders do you think would make the best Prime Minister?"
 ComRes: "For each of these pairs of statements, which one comes closest to your view? - Jeremy Corbyn would make a better Prime Minister than Theresa May/Theresa May would make a better Prime Minister than Jeremy Corbyn"
 ICM: "Putting aside which party you support, and only thinking about your impression of them as leaders, which one of the following do you think would make the best Prime Minister for Britain?"

May vs Corbyn

2017

2016

Cameron vs Corbyn

2016

2015

Multiple party leaders 

Some polls ask voters to choose between multiple party leaders. The questions vary by pollster:

Lord Ashcroft: "Which of the following do you think would make the best Prime Minister?"
ComRes: "Who of the following would make the best Prime Minister after the upcoming General Election?"
YouGov: "Which of the following do you think would make the best Prime Minister?"

2017

2016

Hypothetical polling

See also 
 List of United Kingdom by-elections (2010–present)
 Opinion polling for the 2015 United Kingdom general election
 Opinion polling on the United Kingdom's membership of the European Union (2016–present)

Notes

References

External links 
 Britain Elects – summary of new polls
 Elections in Wales: analysis of Wales-only polling.

2017 United Kingdom general election
Opinion polling for United Kingdom general elections
Opinion polling for United Kingdom votes in the 2010s